Deep Black may refer to:

 Deep Black: Space Espionage and National Security, a 1986 book by William E. Burrows
 Deep Black (video game), a 2012 third-person shooter
 Deep Black, a 2004 Nick Stone Missions novel by Andy McNab
 Deep Black, a book and series by Stephen Coonts and Jim DeFelice

See also 
 Black (disambiguation)
 Tiefschwarz (English: Deep black), a German tech house music duo